Metaeuchromius kimurai ) is a moth in the family Crambidae. It was described by Sasaki in 2005. It is found in Japan on the Okinawa Islands.

References

Crambinae
Moths described in 2005